Mona Shores High School is a public high school in Norton Shores, Michigan, United States. It serves grades 9-12 for Mona Shores Public Schools.

History
Mona Shores Public Schools was formed by merging five K-8 school districts into one K-12 district on 
September 14, 1959. A construction 
bond was passed in the spring of 1960 and Mona Shores High School opened for the 1962-63 school year.

Academics
In the 2020 U.S. News & World Report annual survey of high schools, Mona Shores ranked 147th in Michigan and 4,023rd nationally.

Demographics
The demographic breakdown of the 1,256 students enrolled for the 2018-19 school year was:
Male - 50.2%
Female - 49.8%
Native American/Alaskan - 0.6%
Asian - 2.8%
Black - 11.3%
Hispanic - 4.1%
White - 75.7%
Multiracial - 5.5%
44.9% of the students were eligible for free or reduced-cost lunch.

Athletics
The Mona Shores Sailors compete in the Ottawa-Kent Conference. School colors are navy blue, Columbia blue and white. The following Michigan High School Athletic Association (MHSAA) sanctioned sports are offered:

Baseball (boys) 
Basketball (girls and boys) 
Bowling (girls and boys) 
Competitive cheerleading (girls) 
Cross country (girls and boys) 
Football (boys) 
State champion - 2019, 2020
Golf (girls and boys) 
Boys state champion - 1989, 1991, 2000, 2005
Girls state champion - 2009, 2010, 2011, 2012
Ice hockey (boys) 
State champion - 2000
Lacrosse (girls and boys) 
Soccer (girls and boys) 
Softball (girls) 
Swim and dive (girls and boys) 
Tennis (girls and boys) 
Track and field (girls and boys) 
Volleyball (girls) 
Wrestling (boys)

Arts

Mona Shores offers courses and co-curricular activities in band, chorus and orchestra.

The marching band competes in the Michigan Competing Band Association (MCBA). Mona Shores won MCBA state championships in 1993, 1995, 1998, 1999, 2000 and 2003.

Notable alumni
Justin Abdelkader - National Hockey League (NHL) left winger
Brendan Gielow - golfer, member of the US Walker Cup team in 2009
Tom Kauffman - Emmy Award-winning writer/producer of Rick and Morty
JD Ryznar - Television writer of numerous shows including "The Boss Baby: Back in Business" Additionally, he coined the term "Yacht rock," which has been appropriated by major corporations.

References

External links

Mona Shores Schools

Public high schools in Michigan
1962 establishments in Michigan